Øystein is a Norwegian given name of Old Norse origins. One of its variants is Östen which is mostly used in Sweden. Notable people with the name include:

Øystein Aarseth (1968–1993), Norwegian guitarist (pseudonym Euronymous), co-founder of the black metal band Mayhem
Øystein Alme (born 1960), Norwegian author
Øystein Andersen or Wig Wam, Norwegian hard rock and glam rock band
Øystein Baadsvik (born 1966), Norwegian tuba soloist and chamber musician
Øystein Bache (born 1960), Norwegian comedian and actor
Øystein B. Blix (born 1966), Norwegian jazz musician (trombone) and sound designer
Øystein Bonvik (born 1971), Norwegian communication consultant, writer and lecturer
Øystein Bråten (born 1995), Norwegian freestyle skier
Øystein Brun (born 1975), the guitarist and founder of the Norwegian black metal band Borknagar
Øystein Carlsen (born 1973), Norwegian speed skater
Øystein Dahle (born 1938), Norwegian businessperson and organizational leader
Øystein Djupedal (born 1960), Norwegian politician for the Socialist Left Party
Øystein Dolmen (born 1947), known as Knutsen, Norwegian singer-songwriter, one half of the duo Knutsen & Ludvigsen
Øystein Elgarøy (1929–1998), Norwegian astronomer, with a specialty in solar radio astronomy
Øystein Erlendsson (died 1188), Archbishop of Nidaros from 1161 to his death
Øystein Fevang (born 1963), Norwegian singer and choir conductor
Øystein Fischer (1942–2013), Norwegian physicist and specialist in the field of superconductivity
Øystein Gåre (1954–2010), Norwegian football coach
Øystein Greni (born 1974), the singer and lead guitar player of the Norwegian rock and roll band BigBang
Øystein Grødum (born 1977), Norwegian speedskater, who is a member of Arendal SK
Øystein Halvorsen, Norwegian orienteering competitor who competed in the 1970s
Øystein Haraldsson (c. 1125 – 1157), king of Norway from 1142 to 1157
Øystein Hauge (born 1956), Norwegian writer
Øystein Havang (born 1964), Norwegian handball player
Øystein Hedstrøm (born 1946), Norwegian politician
Øystein Gullvåg Holter (born 1952), Norwegian sociologist and expert on men's studies
Øystein I (1088–1123), King of Norway (as Eystein I) from 1103 to 1123 with his brothers Sigurd the Crusader and Olaf Magnusson
Øystein III, elected a rival King of Norway during the Norwegian Civil War period
Øystein Jarlsbo (born 1961), former Norwegian ice hockey player
Øystein Jevanord (born 1959), Norwegian drummer
Øystein Josefsen (born 1944), Norwegian businessman and former politician for the Conservative Party
Øystein Kristiansen, Norwegian orienteering competitor and World champion
Øystein Ingar Larsen (born 1941), Bishop of the Diocese of Sør-Hålogaland from 1992 to 2006
Øystein Linnebo, Norwegian philosopher of mathematics at Birkbeck College, University of London
Øystein Lønn (1936–2022), Norwegian writer
Øystein Mæland (born 1960), Norwegian psychiatrist, civil servant and politician for the Labour Party
Øystein Mellerud (1938–1989), Norwegian ice hockey player
Øystein Moen (born 1980), Norwegian jazz pianist and composer, plays in the bands Jaga Jazzist and Puma
Øystein Neerland (born 1964), former Norwegian football forward, best known for his time in Molde
Øystein Norvoll (born 1954), Norwegian jazz musician (guitar), winner of the «Gjett på Jazz» (1973)
Øystein Olsen (economist) (born 1952), Norwegian public servant, Governor of the Central Bank of Norway
Øystein Olsen (ice hockey) (born 1969), former Norwegian ice hockey player
Øystein Ore (1899–1968), Norwegian mathematician
Øystein Kvaal Østerbø (born 1981), Norwegian orienteering and ski-orienteering competitor
Øystein Øvretveit (born 1994), Norwegian footballer
Øystein Øystå, born as Øystein Anderssen (1934–2014), Norwegian writer
Øystein Paasche (born 1963), Norwegian musician and drummer in deLillos
Øystein Pettersen (born 1983), Norwegian cross country skier
Øystein Olsen Ravner (1893–1975), Norwegian appointed councilor of state (1940–1941), and minister (1941–1942)
Øystein Rian (born 1945), Norwegian historian
Øystein Rottem (1946–2004), Norwegian philologist, literary historian and literary critic
Øystein Runde (born 1979), Norwegian comics writer and comics artist
Øystein Sevåg (born 1957), Norwegian classical and world music composer and musician
Øystein Slettemark (born 1967), Greenlandic biathlete
Øystein Sørensen (born 1954), Norwegian historian
Per Øystein Sørensen, Norwegian singer and songwriter, vocalist of the new wave/synthpop band Fra Lippo Lippi
Øystein Sunde (born 1947), Norwegian folk singer and guitarist
Øystein Thommessen (1890–1986), Norwegian lawyer
Øystein Wiik (born 1956), Norwegian actor, singer, songwriter and novelist
Øystein Wingaard Wolf (born 1958), Norwegian poet, living and working in Oslo
Øystein Wormdal, retired Norwegian footballer

See also
 Eystein
Østen

References

Norwegian masculine given names